|}

The Yorkshire Cup is a Group 2 flat horse race in Great Britain open to horses aged four years or older. It is run over a distance of 1 mile, 5 furlongs and 188 yards at York in May.

History
Formerly a weight-for-age race, the event was revived as a handicap in 1927. It was originally contested over 2 miles. The first running was won by Templestowe.

The Yorkshire Cup was abandoned from 1940 to 1944. A substitute called the Yorkshire Autumn Cup, for horses aged three or older, was staged in 1945.

The event became a conditions race after the war. It temporarily reverted to a handicap in 1951. That year's edition was titled the Yorkshire Stayers' Handicap. Its previous format was restored in 1952.

The race continued with its original distance until 1965. It was cut to 1¾ miles in 1966. It was given Group 2 status in 1971.

The Yorkshire Cup became part of the British Champions Series in 2011. It is now the first race in the long-distance division, which concludes with the British Champions Long Distance Cup in October.

The race is currently held on the final day of York's three-day Dante Festival meeting. It is run the day after the Dante Stakes.

Records

Most successful horse (3 wins):
 Stradivarius – 2018, 2019, 2022

Leading jockey (8 wins):
 Lester Piggott – Pandofell (1961), Aunt Edith (1966), Knockroe (1972), Bruni (1976), Bright Finish (1977), Noble Saint (1980), Ardross (1981, 1982)

Leading trainer (7 wins):
 Cecil Boyd-Rochfort – The Scout II (1931), Kingstone (1945), Premonition (1954), Dickens (1960), Sagacity (1962), Raise You Ten (1964), Apprentice (1965)

Winners

See also
 Horse racing in Great Britain
 List of British flat horse races

References

 Paris-Turf:
 Racing Post:

 galopp-sieger.de – Yorkshire Cup.
 ifhaonline.org – International Federation of Horseracing Authorities – Yorkshire Cup (2019).
 pedigreequery.com – Yorkshire Cup – York.
 

Open long distance horse races
York Racecourse
Flat races in Great Britain
1927 establishments in England
Recurring sporting events established in 1927
British Champions Series